3-Methyl-2-butanone (methyl isopropyl ketone, MIPK) is a ketone and solvent of minor importance. It is comparable to MEK (Methyl ethyl ketone), but has a lower solvency and is more expensive.

References

Pentanones
Ketone solvents